I Always Wanted to Be a Saint is a 2003 Luxembourgian drama film directed by Geneviève Mersch. It was selected as the Luxembourgish entry for the Best Foreign Language Film at the 76th Academy Awards, but it was not nominated.

Cast
 Marie Kremer as Norah
 Thierry Lefevre as Jean-Michel
 Jeannine Godinas as Marthe
 Raphaëlle Blancherie as Françoise
 Francisco Pestana as L'avocat
 Barbara Roland as Elsa

See also
 List of submissions to the 76th Academy Awards for Best Foreign Language Film
 List of Luxembourgish submissions for the Academy Award for Best International Feature Film

References

External links
 

2003 films
2003 drama films
Luxembourgian drama films
2000s French-language films